"Little Bad Girl" is a single by French DJ David Guetta, featuring vocals from English recording artist Taio Cruz and American rapper Ludacris. It was released for digital download from 27 June 2011 by Virgin Records, serving as the second single from Guetta's latest studio album Nothing but the Beat. This song later appeared on Cruz's third album TY.O.

All three artists co-wrote the song with Frédéric Riesterer and Giorgio Tuinfort, both of whom co-produced the song with Guetta as well as Black Raw.

This is the first of two collaborations between Cruz and Guetta, as Cruz would later co-write Guetta's single "Without You" featuring Usher. This is also the first of two collaborations between Ludacris and Guetta, as the two would later collaborate on the 2012 song "Rest of My Life" also featuring Usher. This is also the second collaboration between Ludacris and Cruz, after Ludacris appeared on the US version of Cruz's single "Break Your Heart".

Music video
The music video was released on YouTube on 11 July 2011. It features Guetta hosting a beach-side disco party called "Endless Night" (which he wants to literally never end) with Cruz and Ludacris in attendance. When Guetta sees the sun start to rise, he and many other guests run down to the beach and they all skid to a halt in front of the sea, causing the Earth to rotate backwards. The sun goes back down and this makes it dark again in other parts of the world when it had just been light. Ludacris can also be seen with a megaphone when rapping his verse. Towards the end of the video, the sun again starts to rise and Guetta runs off to repeat what he did before.

Critical reception
Robert Copsey of Digital Spy gave the song three out of five stars writing, "Unfortunately, the reality of their paring-up [like the perfect double act] is far less enticing. "Look at her go on the dance floor/ She's amazing on the dance floor", Cruz continues over trance-lite synths before ushering his chosen lady to "go, little bad girl" to a by-numbers club-pumping beat on the chorus. The result is more synthetic than a Geordie Shore lass made up for a night on the lash - and about as effective as their patented Slutdrop."

Track listings
 German CD single
 "Little Bad Girl" (Radio Edit) - 3:12
 "Little Bad Girl" (Fedde Le Grand Remix) - 6:43

 German CD single
"Little Bad Girl" (Extended Mix) – 4:43
"Little Bad Girl" (Norman Doray Remix) – 6:48
"Little Bad Girl" (Fedde Le Grand Remix) – 6:43
"Little Bad Girl" (Instrumental Club Mix) – 5:13
"Little Bad Girl" (Radio Edit) – 3:12

 12" vinyl
"Little Bad Girl" (Extended Mix) – 4:43
"Little Bad Girl" (Norman Doray Remix) – 6:48
"Little Bad Girl" (Instrumental Club Mix) – 5:13
"Little Bad Girl" (Fedde Le Grand Remix) – 6:43

 Digital download
"Little Bad Girl" (Radio Edit) – 3:12
"Little Bad Girl" (Instrumental Club Mix) – 5:11

 Digital download - EP
"Little Bad Girl" (Radio Edit) – 3:12
"Little Bad Girl" (Extended Mix) – 4:43
"Little Bad Girl" (Norman Doray Remix) – 6:48
"Little Bad Girl" (Fedde Le Grand Remix) – 6:43
"Little Bad Girl" (Instrumental Club Mix) – 5:13

Charts and certifications

Weekly charts

Certifications

Year-end charts

Release history

References

2011 singles
Taio Cruz songs
David Guetta songs
Ludacris songs
Hip house songs
Record Report Pop Rock General number-one singles
Songs written by David Guetta
Songs written by Ludacris
Songs written by Taio Cruz
Songs written by Giorgio Tuinfort
Songs written by Frédéric Riesterer
Song recordings produced by David Guetta